Jaroš Griemiller of Třebsko was a Czech alchemist, remembered for his illuminated manuscript Rosarium philosophorum.  He worked under Wilhelm von Rosenberg in the 1570s, and dedicated the Rosarium to him.  He completed work on the manuscript in 1578 while he was working in Český Krumlov.

References

Year of birth missing
Year of death missing
Czech alchemists
Czech male writers
16th-century writers
16th-century alchemists